The 1946 Johns Hopkins Blue Jays football team was an American football team that represented Johns Hopkins University as a member of the Mason–Dixon Conference during the 1946 college football season. In its first season under head coach Howdy Myers, Johns Hopkins compiled a 5–3 record (2–0 against conference opponents) and was outscored 117 to 90, largely due to a 53–0 loss in the first game of the season against Middle Three champion Rutgers.

Schedule

References

Johns Hopkins
Johns Hopkins Blue Jays football seasons
Johns Hopkins Blue Jays football